Kelly Ann Aston   (born 22 May 1975) is a Welsh badminton player. She has represented Wales and Great Britain in regional and international competitions, including the Olympics and the Commonwealth Games, winning gold in the 1998 Commonwealth Games, and beat world number one Ye Zhaoying of China in the 1999 IBF World Championships.

Career 
Aston began playing badminton at age nine. Her brother, Ross, was initially trying for the Welsh national team, and she only made the team as a result of accompanying him to the trials.

In 1999, Aston was voted Welsh Woman of the Year; she was appointed a Member of the Order of the British Empire (MBE) in the 2002 Birthday Honours for "services to the community, especially through Sport, in South Wales."

Aston won 13 consecutive Women's Singles titles at the Welsh National Badminton Championships between 1992 and 2004, as well as six Women's Doubles and 4 Mixed Doubles titles. In 1998, she received a gold medal representing Wales at the Commonwealth Games, won silver at the 1998 European Badminton Championships, and bronze at the 2000 European Badminton Championships. She also represented Great Britain at the 1996, 2000 and 2004 Olympic Games.

Personal life 
Aston was born in Pontypridd and attended Bryn Celynnog Comprehensive School. She married her husband, Dylan Aston, in 2002, and has two children, Ethan and Ellen.  is a teacher at the GEMS Wellington Academy-Al Khail in Dubai. She has also been heavily involved in charity work, particularly relating to Down Syndrome, and was the patron of the Down's Syndrome Association of Wales.

Achievements

Commonwealth Games 
Women’s singles

European Championships 
Women's singles

IBF World Grand Prix
The World Badminton Grand Prix has been sanctioned by the International Badminton Federation since 1983.

Women's singles

Women's doubles

IBF International 
Women's singles

Women's doubles

Mixed doubles

References

External links 

Welsh female badminton players
1975 births
Living people
Badminton players at the 1996 Summer Olympics
Badminton players at the 2000 Summer Olympics
Badminton players at the 2004 Summer Olympics
Commonwealth Games gold medallists for Wales
Badminton players at the 1998 Commonwealth Games
Badminton players at the 2006 Commonwealth Games
Olympic badminton players of Great Britain
Sportspeople from Pontypridd
Members of the Order of the British Empire
Commonwealth Games medallists in badminton
Badminton players at the 2002 Commonwealth Games
Medallists at the 1998 Commonwealth Games